Jacob Leland Niemes (October 19, 1919 – March 4, 1966) was a professional baseball player. He was a left-handed pitcher for one season (1943) with the Cincinnati Reds.  For his career, he pitched in three games and recorded no decisions, with a 6.00 earned run average, and 1 strikeout in three innings pitched.

An alumnus of the University of Cincinnati, he was born in Cincinnati, Ohio, and later died in Hamilton, Ohio, at the age of 46.

References

External links

1919 births
1966 deaths
Cincinnati Bearcats baseball players
Cincinnati Reds players
Major League Baseball pitchers
Baseball players from Ohio
Columbia Reds players
Muskogee Reds players
Durham Bulls players
Anniston Rams players
Birmingham Barons players